Ettlinger is a German surname, deriving from Ettlingen, Germany. Notable people with the surname include:

Adrian Ettlinger (1925–2013), American electrical engineer and pioneer in television and video technology
Elisabeth Ettlinger (1915–2012), German-born Swiss archaeologist and academic
Harry L. Ettlinger (1926–2018), American engineer
Jacob Ettlinger (1798–1871), German rabbi and author, and one of the leaders of German Orthodoxy
Leopold Ettlinger (1913–1989), Warburg Institute historian of the Italian renaissance and UC Berkeley Art Department Chair, 1970–80
Marion Ettlinger (born 1949), photographer specializing in author portraits
Max Ettlinger (1877–1929), German psychologist

German-language surnames